Johnny Get Angry (foaled 9 November 2017) is a Group 1 winning New Zealand bred thoroughbred racehorse who is most notable for winning the 2020 Victoria Derby.

Background
Johnny Get Angry was Denis Pagan's first race-horse.

References

External links
Johnny Get Angry's pedigree Pedigree online Thoroughbred Database

New Zealand racehorses
Racehorses bred in New Zealand
Racehorses trained in Australia
2017 racehorse births
Victoria Derby winners